Ihor Koshman (born 7 March 1995) is a professional Ukrainian football midfielder.

Career
Koshman is the product of FC Kremin Kremenchuk youth sportive school. Koshman made his debut for SC Tavriya Simferopol as substituted player in the game against FC Metalurh Zaporizhya on 28 March 2014 in Ukrainian Premier League.

References

External links

1995 births
People from Kremenchuk
Living people
Ukrainian footballers
Association football midfielders
SC Tavriya Simferopol players
FC Metalurh Donetsk players
FC Metalist Kharkiv players
NK Celje players
FC Helios Kharkiv players
FC Samtredia players
FC Metalist 1925 Kharkiv players
FC Kremin Kremenchuk players
FC Shevardeni-1906 Tbilisi players
FC Lviv players
Tallinna JK Legion players
Ukrainian Premier League players
Slovenian PrvaLiga players
Ukrainian First League players
Erovnuli Liga players
Meistriliiga players
Ukrainian expatriate footballers
Expatriate footballers in Slovenia
Ukrainian expatriate sportspeople in Slovenia
Expatriate footballers in Georgia (country)
Ukrainian expatriate sportspeople in Georgia (country)
Expatriate footballers in Estonia
Ukrainian expatriate sportspeople in Estonia
Sportspeople from Poltava Oblast